Jennifer Ruth Greti Oehrli (born 13 January 1989) is a Swiss footballer who plays as a goalkeeper and previously played for BSC YB Frauen in the Nationalliga A. She is a member of the Switzerland national team. She is equally skilled with both feet.

Personal life
Daughter of Rolf and Ruth, Jennifer grew up with her younger sister Svenja in Zollbrück/Rüderswil in the canton of Bern in Switzerland. Her Godparents are from Cyprus, so she often spends her holidays there. She visited the Graduate School of Business in Neuveville and successfully concluded her Professional Maturity of Commerce. In Basel she played football semi-professionally and worked as receptionist in the FC Basel administrative offices. Her intention for the future is to study either sport psychology or food science.

Club career
Oehrli started her children's football as seven-year-old, playing in the same boys team as her cousin. She played as striker in the youth teams of FC Zollbrück and was soon called up to play for the U-14 regional selection team Bern/Jura. Because there were not enough goalkeepers in the selection team she played in goal and at the club she played as striker. Even at this early age she was equally skilled with both feet. After seven years playing in Zollbrück she received an offer from the women's football club SC Worb to play as goalkeeper in their U-18 youth team. Just one year later, as Worb's first team achieved promotion to the Swiss National League B (NLB), she was asked to join the Ladies team. At just sixteen years of age she played the entire season in the NLB.

A year later Oehrli signed for FFC Zuchwil 05 in the Nationalliga A. While at Zuchwil, she obtained international experience, playing in the Women's Champions League 2006–07 and 2007–08. In the 2006-2007 season Oehrli won the Swiss Championship and the Liga-Cup with her new club and they were Championship runners-up the following year.

After three years playing for Zuchwil she moved to FC Thun Frauen and one year later to FC Basel Frauen. She scored her first goal in the Swiss National League A (NLA) with a Penalty kick in the 10-0 home win against GC Zürich Frauen in the last game of the 2010-2011 season on 22 May 2011. At the end of the 2012-13 season Basel were Championship runners-up and Cup finalists.

In June 2013 it was announced that Oehrli had transferred to BV Cloppenburg women team.

International career
Oehrli played her international debut for the Swiss national team in the 0-4 defeat against the Netherlands in an international Tournament on 3 March 2010. After Marisa Brunner retired from international football, Oehrli was nominated as the new number 1 in the Swiss team. She played her first game as number 1 during the 0-2 defeat against France on 5 May 2010.

During the match in the 2013 Cyprus Cup on 13 March 2013 against New Zealand she suffered a fractured forearm.

Titles and Honours
Zuchwil
 Nationalliga A champion: 2006–07
 Nationalliga A runner-up: 2007–08
 Liga-Cup winner: 2006–07
 Player in the UEFA Women's Cup: 2006–07 and 2007–08

Basel
 Nationalliga A runner-up: 2012–13

References

External links
 Jennifer Oehrli profile on the website FC Basel
 Jennifer Oehrli profile on the website UEFA

1989 births
Living people
Swiss women's footballers
People of Greek Cypriot descent
Swiss expatriate sportspeople in Germany
Swiss expatriate women's footballers
Swiss expatriate sportspeople in Spain
Expatriate women's footballers in Spain
Expatriate women's footballers in Germany
Switzerland women's international footballers
Women's association football goalkeepers
Footballers from Bern
Atlético Madrid Femenino players
2015 FIFA Women's World Cup players
BSC YB Frauen players
FC Basel Frauen players
Swiss Women's Super League players
BV Cloppenburg (women) players
FFC Zuchwil 05 players